Brave Command Dagwon (勇者指令ダグオン) is a Japanese anime series begun in 1996, created by Takara and Sunrise under the direction of Tomomi Mochizuki (who also did screenplay for the show) and was the seventh and penultimate entry in the Brave (Yūsha) franchise.

Earth is the target of the former Sargasso prisoners who seize control of Sargasso and attack our planet - to counter this, alien officer Brave Alien selects five (and then later seven as the series progresses) teenage men from Earth to receive the wrist-worn DagCommanders that shall transform them into the series' title team, the alien equivalent to "brave".

Drawing inspiration from anime franchises which feature transforming heroes as well as anime stock footage hero transformation sequences, the selected teenage protagonists transform into special  battle suits, by activating their DagCommanders' transformation function with the transformation call "Try Dagwon", which grant them pseudo-elemental powers and attacks as well as protection, weapons, tools and amplified physical power. If even greater power is needed, the heroes can merge with additional support units (or perhaps each other) to strengthen their Fusion Combination transformations by forming a physical mecha combination.

In addition to the title protagonists, other friendly beings soon make arrivals to aid their efforts - for example: Gunkid, whose own transformations include a tank, jet or the hand-held , was initially on Sargasso's side before he decides to support the Dagwon team, and Lian, as such, proceeds to become Gunkid's teacher.

The protagonists also have , a base which En, one of the Dagwon team's members, uses one ability of: , a form of Fusion Combination which is slightly stronger than the basic kind as a user assimilates DagBase, transforming themselves and DagBase into .

Composition
This series consists of 48 episodes, first aired on Nagoya TV from February 3, 1996 to January 25 next year. The show is currently not licensed in the US as is the status with all the other entries in the Brave franchise, except the franchises' last incarnation to span an anime presentation:The King of Braves GaoGaiGar.

Team

Voiced by Kōichi Tōchika

The fire warrior.

The stereotypical hot-headed, juvenile-delinquent-like and determined type. Reckless, short-tempered and stubborn to a fault, but also brave, fearless and a loyal friend. En often locks heads with Kai, who just so happens to be his superior in school. He develops a close friendship with Ryu in the beginning of the series. En's basic mecha is Fire Stratos (a police car). His first auxiliary mecha is Fire Jumbo, based on a Boeing 747 jumbo jet (Fire Jumbo is equipped with two sub-ordinates: Fire Ladder, based on a Japanese fire truck and Fire Rescue, based on a Japanese ambulance). His second auxiliary mecha is Fire Shovel, based on an excavator - from Fire Shovel's debut (number 31) onwards, Fire Jumbo, after restoration, becomes used less to the extent of not being used at all, instead used only for combination into Super Fire Dagwon.

Voiced by Takehito Koyasu

The speed warrior.

Kai is head of the student council and practitioner of Kendo. He is almost always seen carrying a shinai which he uses to enforce the rules at school. He also tries to remind the team of their job and that it's not only fun and games, but does not always succeed since his strict, no-nonsense personality tends to rub them the wrong way. Kai's mecha is Turbo Liner which is based on a 300 Series Shinkansen.

Voiced by Jin Yamanoi

The weapons warrior.

Shin is a luckless flirt with girls and has an alarming tendency to get shot down whenever he talks to one. In spite of this, he is friendly and good-natured. He is also skilled at martial arts, as seen when he uses Judo to stop a purse-snatching in the first episode. Shin's vehicle is Armor Liner, based on an E1 Series Shinkansen.

Voiced by Hiro Yūki

The sky warrior.

Shy and a bit geeky, Yoku is the brains of the team. He is very knowledgeable and computer savvy. He also likes to study strange and unusual things. Yoku's vehicle is Wing Liner, based on a 400 Series Shinkansen.

Voiced by Atsushi Kisaichi

The shadow warrior.

Calm, mysterious and a puzzle even to his team members. He's the only one to have "subordinates": transforming beast mecha stored in the form of cards. He was the last of the team to achieve his mecha fusion. Ryu develops a close friendship with En in the beginning of the series. Ryu is one of two members of the team who does not gain any new after-Fusion-Combination forms after gaining one. Ryu's basic mecha is Shadow Jet, based on an F-15 Eagle.

Voiced by Hisao Egawa

The ground warrior.

Geki has a rivalry with En, who injured his arm in a fight at Geki's old school. He is even more short tempered and impatient than En and has a serious crush on Maria. Geki had something of a misguided view on being a hero at first, but eventually became a valuable member. His Fusion Combination transformation combines with Kai's, Shin's and Yoku's own to assemble the super form of an already existing mecha combination. Geki's vehicle is Drill Liner, based on a JRN Class C62 steam engine (while Drill Liner is designed as a steam engine, it is unknown if it is based on either a complete steam engine which actually steams or a steam engine that is an electricity-powered visual replica model and which steams only for display reasons - this is due to a steam engine being used as the template of a mecha).

Voiced by Kappei Yamaguchi

The thunder warrior.

An alien officer who appears later in the series. He is very good-looking, which earns him the unwanted advances of practically every female student at the boys' school. Rai hates the attention and it easily embarrasses and flusters him. Like En, his Fusion Combination transformation is a stand-alone mecha and does not combine with the others. his auxiliary mecha Thunder Shuttle's transformation into the body of Thunder Dagwon is based on Galaxy Shuttle from Transformers: Victory. Like Ryu, Rai doesn't combine with any other mechs to achieve an upgrade. Rai's basic vehicle is Thunder Bike, based on a sidecar motorcycle .

Allies

Humans
 
 Voiced by Miki Nagasawa
 En's classmate. Because she is very interested in occultism, she is often implicated into the commotion of aliens. She and En have been friends since they were 9 years old, they often quarreled with each other. But she gradually came to love him.

 
 Voiced by Naomi Nagasawa
 Maria's younger brother. His nickname is "Gaku". Because he is very interested in Dagwons, he is often implicated into the commotion of aliens, too.

 Voiced by Yuko Mizutani
 A high school reporter trying to find out the identity of Dagwon and later becomes Shin's love interest despite her not liking him and having affection for his alter ego DagArmor.

 
 Voiced by Kumiko Nishihara
 A junior high student and a friend of Yoku.

 
 Voiced by Hiroko Konishi
 Ryu's younger sister. She has the power to foresee the future by dream, and predicts the revival of Fire Jumbo.

 
 Voiced by Yū Shimaka
 The principal of Sankai High School.

 
 Voiced by Ken Shiroyama
 The vice-principal of Sankai High School.

 
 Voiced by Mika Kanai
 Kai's younger sister who is more lean-back than her brother. She only appears in the OVA.

Aliens
 
 Voiced by Jōji Nakata
 An alien police officer who chooses the team's members. He is killed by Mado and Gedo in retaliation for killing Hido.

 
 Voiced by Yutaka Hirose
 A warrior whose people, the Sword Aliens, were exterminated by Arch Seijin a long time ago. His transformation from humanoid is a sword. He joins forces with the title protagonists after they prove themselves regarding their worth to him and he learns a lesson about personal revenge vendettas - common ground is established.

 
 Voiced by Miki Nagasawa
 Formerly named Gundroid T96, a young artillery youth who used to be corrupted by Sargasso, but eventually turns to the side of good by joining Brave Command Dagwon - Lian, as such, proceeds to become Gunkid's teacher. The power of the Cannon is so strong that when used by Fire Dagwon, a recoil forces the user back) and Power Dagwon (Power Dagwon's all-purpose Power Arm which is mounted on the left upper arm goes into the ground so that Power Dagwon, when the Infinity Cannon fires, is not forced back. Power Dagwon uses an in-built connector stored in the right shoulder).

 
 Voiced by Yumi Fukamizu
 An alien Dagwon officer and a galaxy-elemented warrior. Luna comes to Earth in the middle of the series and creates Fire Shovel after Fire Jumbo's temporary destruction. She is kidnapped afterward and brainwashed by Hido into his bidding. Kai is able to free her after he tries to kill Hido. She is also shown to have feelings for him. She has no basic (and therefore Fusion Combination) and ehancement mecha (and therefore physical mecha combination) like the others, but flies a fighter ship instead. She wields a lipstick-beam rapier in her DagTector armor.

 
 Voiced by Tomoko Ishimura
 The OVA's title character. Although shy-natured he is of a race of crystal-like aliens called the Deandozol that drain the energy of stars unless they are killed in juvenile form. In order to stop him, Kenta himself uses and merges the Dagwon team's powers into a new humanoid mecha which is used for his own destruction.

Major antagonists

Arch Alien
 The first major villain in the series. He is responsible for exterminating the Sword Aliens a long time ago. He wears black knight-like armour and is revealed to look human underneath his armour when he is defeated by Lian.

Warugaia Seijin Brothers

 Hido
 Voiced by Masahito Yabe
First-appearing in his human disguise, crashing into Luna's ship as she is leaving earth, kidnapping and then brainwashing her into doing his bidding. He tries to have her kill Kai who is able to break the brainwashing. He is killed by Brave Seijin.

 Gedo
 Voiced by Takashi Nagasako
The muscle of the brothers. Killed by Power Dagwon & Lian

 Mado
 Voiced by Koji Ishii
The leader of the three. Killed by Super Fire Dagwon with Lian and Gunkid

 Genocide
 Voiced by Ryuzaburo Otomo
He is responsible for the Sargasso prison break. His power is machine and organism possession. He manipulates the prisoners throughout the entire series when his asteroid-like body crashes into Sargosso and takes over the prison's computer system. He was thought to be killed when Sargasso was split in half by DagBase. He survives and possesses Fire Jumbo (also transforming into the body of Fire Dagwon), creating a barrier of hatred that consumes the Earth. Finally killed when En forces a combination into Super Fire Dagwon and self-destructs in space.

Minor antagonists
Sandoll Alien: Appears in episode 1. Powers include a capsule form for space travel, palm sand missiles, reformation after body part or entire body destruction and a two-or-more-Sandoll combination to form a slightly stronger Sandoll kind. Upon combination with each other they acquire the ability to shoot concentrated sand from the torso.
Zargoss Alien: There are several antagonists who spin off of or are in some way related to this Alien that appear in episodes 2, 8, 16 & 31 or exclusively in either some or at least a minimum of one of these 4 episodes:
Zargoss Soldier: Powers include super speeds, explosive saliva, invisibility, eye lasers and human disguise transformation capabilities. Reappear in Brave Saga.
Zargoss Robo: Powers include levitation, invisibility, underside energy bolts, eye, torso, and pelvis energy beams, and torso lasers.
Mognel: Appears only in episode 8. Powers include burrowing, hypnotic snoring that becomes more powerful over time, a rubbery body with a high resistance to cold, and a powerful tail. Reappears in Brave Saga.
Sister Zargoss: Appear only in episode 31. Powers include flight, acid streams from the mouth, and super speed. They are the elites of the Zargoss Seijin.
Queen Zargoss: Appears only in episode 31. Powers include eye energy bolts, an energy field, and mouth energy bolts that convert objects into stone. She is the leader and possible mother of the Zargoss Seijin.
Gallon Alien: Appears in episode 3 with an 18-episodes-later reappearance. Powers include a life-draining slime body, emitting electricity, body spears, and a high resistance to heat.
Death Pulse Alien: Appears in episode 4. Powers include levitation, circular saw top probes, and an electrical force field. This Alien has a 'Robo' relation that appears one episode before episode 4, the 4th episode being the appearance of this Alien after the Robo's first appearance:
Death Pulse Robo: Appears in episodes 3 and 4. Powers include flight, swimming, an underside drill, fast spinning, and four flamethrowers on the top of the body.
Electron Alien: Appears in episode 5. Powers include planetary travel in an orb of light, emitting electrical bolts and balls, body conversion into electricity, electricity-absorption-powered size increase, an electric force field and electric-blade-spawning from the hands.
Chaos Alien: Appears in episode 6. Powers include flight, possessing objects and reinforcing their structure, and reformation.
Guardroid: Appears in episode 7. They are the former jailer robots of Sargasso before a cosmic storm hits the prison and accidentally releases the prisoners - they are then made assistants of the antagonists. They are armed with an assault rifle.
Gososa: Appears in episode 7. Powers include flight, Guardroid storage, a black hole cell, a pair of punching arms armed with palm lasers, and a 16-tube rocket pod.
Space Locust: Appear in episode 11. Powers include sharp teeth and flight. They serve as the personal minions of Arch Alien.
Gallabird Alien: Appears in episodes 9 and 21. Powers include flight at mach 8, hurricane winds from the wings, a grapple tentacle in the forehead, and acid streams from the mouth. Reappears in Brave Saga.
Zamuza: Appear in episode 9. Powers include growth by eating, wall crawling, and mouth webs. Reappears in Brave Saga.
Killad Alien: Appears in episode 10. Powers include absorbing defeated enemies using a forehead laser to absorb their powers and teleportation.
Evolved Killad: Assumed in episode 10 with a reappearance 11 episodes later. Powers include gorilla-style strength, tiger-style agility and fangs, a tank cannon on the left shoulder, a pair of missile launchers on the right shoulder, jet-powered flight, and projectile resistance. After absorbing a destroyer class warship his new body weapons consist of machine gun turrets, a missile pod and a triple-barreled howitzer cannon while his body gains a resistance to blades.
Armor Alien: Appears in episodes 12 and 21. Powers include a ball form capable of planetary travel, burrowing and self-defense against most objects, iron consumption, thick head armor and launchable needles from the mouth. After eating enough iron it can grow launchable spikes in its ball form.
Wildy Alien: Appears in episode 13. Powers include a heat reflective sword, high jumping, and can cause illusions from his single eye.
Wildon: Appears in episode 13. Powers include flight and mouth flames. It serves as the mount for Wildy.
Rod Alien: Appears in episode 14. Powers include flight and an electric whip for each arm.
Griffin: Appears in episode 14. Powers include flight, mouth energy bolts that rival napalm, mouth sonic waves, armored wings, growth over time, a high resistance to heat, and lasers from the forehead emerald.
Succubus: Appears in episodes 15 and 21. Powers include human disguises, hypnotic eyes, extendable tentacle fingers, teleportation, electric capture rings from her staff, size changing, and mouth flames.
Phoenix Alien: Appears in episodes 17 and 21. Powers include a high body temperature, levitation, mouth flames, an egg-like regenerative core with telekinetic properties and black electric bolts, and fire absorption. Reappears in Brave Saga.
Vander Alien: Appears in episode 18. Powers include hypnotizing children and entrapping them in spheres of light, floating on top of water, tentacles in his stomach, and flight. Reappears in Brave Saga.
Drangran Alien and Drangran Spider: Appear in episode 19.
 Drangran Alien's powers include extendable tentacle limbs, painful screams, and when wearing their bio-suits are armed with right wrist lasers.
 Drangran Spider's only known power is emitting webs from its mouth.
Space Seed Plant: Appears in episode 19. Powers include destructive vines and acidic spores upon blooming.
Nouvelle Alien: Appear in episodes 20 and 21. Powers include a barrel-less laser pistol and flying saucers armed with jade converting energy bolts and spike missiles.
Hydron Alien: Appears in episode 21. Powers include levitation, teleportation, reviving the dead, a bone scythe, summoning wormholes, holograms, and combining with revived spirits to form a skull-like tank.
Demos: Appears in episode 22. Powers include flight, teleportation, emitting lightning bolts from his hands, a sword made of electricity, and size changing.
Mekaju Alien: Appears in episodes 23 and 24. Powers include draining the life out of surrounding plant life, a grid energy barrier, reformation, and solar radiation absorption to power the Infinity Cannon. He is the former owner of Gunkid.
Cameron Alien: Appears in episode 25. Powers include flight, shape-shifting and body bombs.
Demaka Alien: Appears in episode 26. Powers include merging into the environment, levitation, projecting images with his eye-like body, and turning into a cockroach.
Mouser Alien: Appear in episode 27. Powers include reproduction by mitosis by consuming nutrients and super speed.
Mouser Robo: Appears in episode 27. Powers include flight, a mouth tractor beam, four energy cannons on the nose, energy beams from its launchable wired arms, gun turrets around the body, armor thick enough to withstand the Infinity Cannon, stunning energy bolts from the arms, and can release a drill from said arms.
Gumopider Alien: Appears in episode 28. Powers include levitation, forehead and palm webs, solidifying clouds, wings that can control web movements, and eye lasers.
Radonpa Alien: Appears in episode 29. He possesses no known powers.
Death Cop: Appears in episode 32. Powers and tools include a slicing whip from the right wrist, a laser pistol, and Fusion Combination with his ship. He is a former Dagwon officer who turns to crime. Death Cop faces En in a fierce battle over the course of his appearance.
Death Cop Powered: The Fusion Combination of Death Cop and his ship into a mecha body form assumed during his battle with En. Powers include a three-barreled machine gun in the left wrist, high jumping, a slicing electric whip in the right wrist, an energy saber stored in the left hip, and a powerful energy cannon called the Death Buster that is similar to the Infinity Cannon.
Futtoba Alien: Appears in episode 33. Powers include levitation, weather manipulation, and hiding in a cumulonimbus cloud.
Pat Alien: Appear in episode 34. Their only known power is having a metallic armored body.
Heavy Machine Robo: Appear in episode 34. Powers include flight, four grapple claw arms, and storing metal in their canister-like body.
Patrol Machine Robo: Appears in episode 34. Its only known power is a pair of claws for arms.
Savalas Alien: Appears in episode 35. Powers include a flying orb that can manipulate water and has a high resistance to cold, swimming, and sharp claws.
Pulse Alien: Appears in episode 36. Powers include converting his body into electricity and eye beams.
Trucker Alien: Appears in episode 37. Powers include a turbine in its back used for speed and morphing into different types of trucks. Upon fully evolving he is armed with a pair of missile pods, a pair of machine guns on h its face, a cannon on its "scalp", and remote tires armed with a pair of spikes.
Ashura Shura: Appears in episode 38. Powers include a human disguise, telepathy, six spider legs from the back, and extendable arms.
Zelma Alien: Appears in episode 41. Powers include flight, weather manipulation, tentacles that emit black energy bolts, a force field capable of emitting energy beams strong enough to obliterate mountains in one hit, and energy shockwaves and hurricane-force winds from below the head section.
Bomber Alien: Appears in episode 43. Powers include flight, spawning explosions around him, and a nuclear bomb within his body.
Battle Robo: Appear in episode 44. Powers include flight and a beam machine gun.

External links
勇者指令ダグオン (Japanese) - Sunrise's Brave website's official Brave Command Dagwon index
 
勇者指令ダグオン 水晶の瞳の少年 OVA (Japanese) - official Brave website page for the OVA
 

1996 anime television series debuts
1997 anime OVAs
Sunrise (company)
Super robot anime and manga
Brave series